This is a list of members of the South Australian Legislative Council from 1843 to 1851. Beginning with the Royal Instructions gazetted 15 June 1843, there were four official and four non-official members of the legislative council consisting of: the governor, colonial secretary, advocate-general, and registrar-General with four non-official members being nominated by the Crown. The council was the only chamber of government until the House of Assembly was created in 1857.

 Bartley was acting while Smillie was on leave 1849
 Sturt was absent exploring 1844–1845, MacDonald acted 
 Hanson was acting while Smillie was on leave 1851

References

Members of South Australian parliaments by term
19th-century Australian politicians